The 1902 Montana football team represented the University of Montana in the 1902 college football season. They were led by first-year head coach Dewitt Peck, and finished the season with a record of zero wins and two losses (0–2).

Schedule

References

Montana
Montana Grizzlies football seasons
College football winless seasons
Montana football